Kampong Kupang is a village in Tutong District, Brunei, about  from the district town Pekan Tutong. The population was 1,795 in 2016. It is one of the villages within Mukim Keriam, a mukim subdivision in the district.

Facilities 
The village primary school is Orang Kaya Ali Wanika Setia Diraja Kupang Primary School, whereas Kupang Religious School is the village school for the country's Islamic religious primary education.

Kampong Kupang Mosque is the village mosque; it was inaugurated on 10 February 1984 by the then Chief Kadi of Brunei. The mosque can accommodate 500 worshippers.

References 

Kupang